Günther von Wüllersleben (died May 3 or 4, 1252) was the eighth grandmaster of the Teutonic Order, reigning from 1249 or 1250 to 1252.

Biography 
Gunther hailed from a ministerialis family from Hersfeld Abbey in Bad Hersfeld, Hesse. He joined the Teutonic Order at an unknown date, but was serving in Acre by 1215. He had close connections to various grandmasters. In 1244, it is documented that he was in Prussia, as well as in 1246 when he was present with Grandmaster Heinrich von Hohenlohe.

He may be the identity behind three Gunther's mentioned in records around the time, which means that he may have also been Komtur of Brindisi around 1218, Marshall of the Teutonic Order from around 1228 to 1230, and land commander of Apulia from 1240 to 1244.

In 1249 or 1250, Gunther was elected Grandmaster of the Teutonic Order. Little is known about his reign, but he is thought to have attempted to reconcile the pro and anti-papal factions within the order. He died in Acre on May 3 or 4, 1252.

References 

1252 deaths
Grand Masters of the Teutonic Order
People from Hesse
Year of birth unknown